Fatty-acid peroxygenase (fatty acid hydroxylase (ambiguous), P450 peroxygenase, CYP152A1, P450BS, P450SPalpha) is an enzyme with systematic name fatty acid:hydroperoxide oxidoreductase (RH-hydroxylating). This enzyme catalyses the following chemical reaction

 fatty acid + H2O2  3- or 2-hydroxy fatty acid + H2O

Fatty-acid peroxygenase is a cytosolic heme-thiolate protein.

References

External links 
 

EC 1.11.2